René Jayet (20 May 1906 – 31 October 1953) was a French film director and producer. Followed Des quintuplés au pensionnat, Moumou, Les Aventuriers de l'air, Une nuit de noces and Le Cabaret du grand large.

Filmography

Director 

  Une femme a passé (1928)
 Casaque damier... toque blanche (1928)
  Couturier de mon cœur (1935)
  Le Champion de ces dames (1935)
  Passeurs d'hommes (1937)
 Deuxième bureau contre kommandantur (1939)
  Retour au bonheur (1940)
Ici l'on pêche (1941)
 Vingt-cinq ans de bonheur (1943)
 Le Cabaret du grand large (1946)
  Le Testament (1946, short)
  Cinq à sept (1946, short)
 Mandrin (1947)
  L'Homme de la nuit (1947)
 Bichon (1948)
 Le dernier quart d'heure (1949, short)
 My Aunt from Honfleur (1949)
 Une nuit de noces (1950)
Les Aventuriers de l'air (1950)
 Le Chéri de sa concierge (1951)
 Moumou (1951)
  Des quintuplés au pensionnat (1953)

Producer 
 1949 : Le dernier quart d'heure (short film)
 1950 : Les Aventuriers de l'air
 1951 : Moumou

External links 
  
 René Jayet on 

French producers
Film directors from Paris
1906 births
1953 deaths